Kerkdriel is a town in the Dutch province of Gelderland. It is a part of the municipality of Maasdriel, and lies about 8 km north of 's-Hertogenbosch.

The town of Kerkdriel had 6,765 inhabitants, on 1 January 2019. The approximate built-up area of the town is 1.5 km², and contains 2,835 residences.
The statistical area "Kerkdriel", which includes peripheral parts of the village, as well as the surrounding countryside, has a population of around 10,210.

Due to its positioning between two rivers (Meuse and Waal), a strong local linguistic accent developed during the post second-world-war period. Those who speak the "Driels" accent may be identified via the test phrase "Kees de Beer" (proper: Keas d'n Bear).

References

Populated places in Gelderland
Maasdriel